This is a list of composers by name, alphabetically sorted by surname, then by other names. The list of composers is by no means complete. It is not limited by classifications such as genre or time period; however, it includes only music composers of significant fame, notability or importance who also have current Wikipedia articles. For lists of music composers by other classifications, see lists of composers.

This list is not for arrangers or lyricists (see list of music arrangers and lyricists), unless they are also composers.  Likewise, songwriters are listed separately, for example in a list of singer-songwriters and list of Songwriters Hall of Fame inductees.

A

B

C

D

E

F

G

H

I

J

K

L

M

N

O

P

Q

R

S

T

U

V

W

X

Y

Z

See also
Lists of composers
List of operas by composer which lists more than 700 opera composers, their dates and works.

References

External links